Walter Kusch (born 31 May 1954 in Hildesheim) is a German former swimmer who competed in the 1972 Summer Olympics and in the 1976 Summer Olympics.

References

1954 births
Living people
German male swimmers
German male breaststroke swimmers
Olympic swimmers of West Germany
Swimmers at the 1972 Summer Olympics
Swimmers at the 1976 Summer Olympics
Olympic bronze medalists for West Germany
Olympic bronze medalists in swimming
World Aquatics Championships medalists in swimming
European Aquatics Championships medalists in swimming
Medalists at the 1976 Summer Olympics
Sportspeople from Hildesheim
20th-century German people